Mostafa Ahmed Abdelaziz Mohamed Shobeir (born 17 March 2000) is an Egyptian professional footballer who plays as a goalkeeper for Al Ahly.

Personal life
Shobeir is the son of former Egyptian national team goalkeeper Ahmed Shobair.

Career statistics

Club

Notes

Honours
Al Ahly
 Egypt Cup: 2019–20
 FIFA Club World Cup: Third-Place 2020, Third-Place 2021

References

2000 births
Living people
Sportspeople from Giza
Egyptian footballers
Egypt youth international footballers
Association football goalkeepers
Egyptian Premier League players
Al Ahly SC players